Darren Willis (born 1 October 1968) is an Australian former professional rugby league footballer who played for Penrith and Western Suburbs.

Playing career
Willis played mostly on the wing and occasionally as a centre. He started his career at Penrith, which he came to from Lithgow Workers.

While with Penrith he made 20 first-grade appearances, nine of them in the club's premiership winning 1991 season. He didn't take part in Penrith's finals campaign, but travelled to England to play in the 1991 World Club Challenge against Wigan and scored their only try in a losing cause.

From 1992 to 1998 he played for Western Suburbs, featuring in 144 first-grade games and scoring 49 tries.  His final game in the top grade was in Round 21 1998 against Canterbury-Bankstown which ended in a 56-14 loss at Belmore Sports Ground.  During this time he represented NSW Country as a winger in four City vs Country Origin fixtures.

References

External links
Darren Willis at Rugby League project

1968 births
Living people
Australian rugby league players
Country New South Wales Origin rugby league team players
Penrith Panthers players
Western Suburbs Magpies players
Rugby league players from New South Wales
Rugby league wingers